Bles Bridges (22 July 1946, in Viljoensdrif, Orange Free State – 24 March 2000, near Bloemhof, North West), born Lawrence John Gabriel Bridges, was a South African singer. He became known as Bles Bridges, as his Irish grandfather called him "Bles" (meaning "bald" in Afrikaans), due to his very thin hair from an early age.

Married to Leonie Bridges from 1969 until his death on 24 March 2000, he also had a long-term relationship with Marietjie van Heerden in the 90s. 
 
He made his 1st album in 1972 under the nickname, Morné with a lady called Mimi van Heerden, called, Adios, my skat.
He released his first solo album in 1982, Onbekende Weermagman (Unknown Soldier). His professional career began in 1984, with the release of his second album, Bles, which went gold in under a month (25,000 copies) and included Maggie, one of his better-known songs. The album had sold twice that by the time his third album was released. At the time of his death, Bles had sold more than 2.6 million albums (records and CDs). Up to 2016, he sold over 3 million records, making him the biggest selling male singer in the Afrikaans Music industry.

Soon Bles Bridges began alternating between Afrikaans and English language albums, to great acclaim. He also began working with Eurovision South Africa. In 2000, he began recording an album with his friends in the music industry. The first song - a duet with Patricia Lewis (and his last song as it turned out, as he died within a week of finishing it) - was "The First Kiss Goodnight" by Dennis East; it was recorded on 21 March 2000. His biggest hit was "Ruiter van die Windjie" (Rider of the Wind), which was released in 1986.

In the 1980s, he held a concert in support of the Volkshulpskema (People's Help Scheme) of the Afrikaner Weerstandsbeweging, a far right paramilitary organisation, which raised R10,000.

He had cancer during the 1980s and gave generously to charity for cancer research after his recovery. His wife Leonie was his sound engineer and the composer and/or songwriter of most of his songs, including most of his biggest hits, including "Maggie" and "I am the Eagle, you're the Wind", among others. It was his custom to hand out roses to some of the female audience members in the front row at his concerts.. This was also the basis for a Leon Schuster skit, in the hit movie, Oh Schucks ..... It's Schuster! (1989). In the skit, Shuster, dressed as an Afrikaner lady, became irate when Bridges refused to give her a rose. Chaos ensued.

His career highlight was when he performed to a soldout 8,000-seater Super Bowl at Sun City, five times on one weekend, becoming the first and only artist to do so, as feature artist on 14 and 15 November 1987. He actually managed to draw a bigger crowd than Frank Sinatra did when he opened the Super Bowl in 1982.

Bles died in a motorcar accident on 24 March 2000, leaving behind his wife, Leonie, and children Sunette and Victor. More than 20,000 mourners turned up for his funeral.

On 26 January 2020, Bles was also inaugurated as a living legend in the South African Legends Museum. He was one of only 20 legends from whom a bust was also made.

Albums & Cd's Released.
 Morne en Marie Sing - 1972
 Onbekende Weermagman - 1982
 Bles - 1984
 Uit die Boonste Rakke - 1985
 Vir een en Almal - 1986
 I Am the Eagle, You're the Wind - 1986
 Reik Na Die Sterre - 1987
 Fight For Love - 1987
 Laat My Lewe, Laat My Liefhê - 1988
 Ons Eerste Ontmoeting - 1989
 Nog 'N Nuwe Dag - 1989
 The Devil and the Song - 1989
 Let Me Love You - 1990
 Back on My Feet Again - 1991
 Soos Nooit Tevore - 1992
 Am I That Easy To Forget - 1993
 One Dance With You - 1994
 Grootste Treffers - 1994
 Sproetjies Kom Terug - 1995
 Love and Roses - My Greatest Hits - 1996
 Die Hart Van My Moeder - 1997
 Sweef Soos 'N Arend - 1998
 Classics My Way - 1998
 Country my Way - 1999
 Goue & Platinum Treffers Deur Die Jare Heen - 2000
 Môre Bring 'N Nuwe Dag - 2000
 Goue & Platinum Treffers Deur Die Jare Heen (Vol II) - 2000 (released 26 September 2000)
 Net Vir Jou (10 Jaar Huldeblyk) - 2010
 Die Bekroonde Kunstenaas - 2011

Released videos
 In Search of Love
 Op Toer Met Bles (On Tour with Bles)

Movie
He starred in a 1989 movie called The Devil and the Song.

References

1946 births
2000 deaths
20th-century South African male singers
People from Metsimaholo Local Municipality
White South African people
South African people of Irish descent
South African pop singers